William Weir Stickney (24 Jun 1801 – 16 Mar 1888) was an American attorney and politician who served as the United States Attorney for the District of New Hampshire.

Biography
Stickney was born on June 24, 1801, in Enfield, New Hampshire, to Daniel and Sarah (Morse) Stickney. He graduated from Dartmouth College in 1823. He was admitted to the New Hampshire bar in 1826. Stickney practiced law in Concord, Newmarket, and Exeter, New Hampshire.

Stickney served twice in the New Hampshire House of Representatives. He represented Newmarket from 1839 to 1841, and Exeter in 1855.

In 1849, Stickney was appointed the United States Attorney for the District of New Hampshire. In 1857, Stickney was appointed the Judge Probate of Rockingham County, New Hampshire.

Stickney married Frances A. Hough on November 5, 1860.  The couple had three children.

References

1801 births
1888 deaths
United States Attorneys for the District of New Hampshire
New Hampshire lawyers
United States Department of Justice lawyers
Members of the New Hampshire House of Representatives
People from Enfield, New Hampshire
19th-century American politicians
19th-century American lawyers